West Side Historic District may refer to:
 West Side Historic District (Longmont, Colorado), listed on the National Register of Historic Places (NRHP) in Boulder County
 West Side Historic District (Aurora, Illinois), listed on the NRHP in Kane County
 West Side Historic District (Shelbyville, Indiana), listed on the NRHP in Shelby County
 West Side Historic District (Anaconda, Montana), listed on the NRHP in Deer Lodge County
 West Side Historic District (Kalispell, Montana), listed on the NRHP in Flathead County
 West Side Historic District (Carson City, Nevada), listed on the NRHP in Nevada
 West Side Historic District (Hendersonville, North Carolina), listed on the NRHP in Henderson County
 West Side Historic District (Saratoga Springs, New York), listed on the NRHP in Saratoga County
 West Side Historic District (Corsicana, Texas), listed on the NRHP in Navarro County
 New Richmond West Side Historic District, listed on the NRHP in St. Croix County, Wisconsin